The 2017 Tyrone Intermediate Football Championship is the 2017 edition of Tyrone GAA's second-tier gaelic football tournament for intermediate clubs in County Tyrone, Northern Ireland. Sixteen teams compete with the winners receiving promotion to the Tyrone Senior Football Championship the next year and representing Tyrone in the Ulster Intermediate Club Football Championship.

Pomeroy Plunkett's won the 2016 IFC final after they defeated Derrylaughan 3-12 to 1-12 in the final in Omagh.

Pomeroy Plunkett's, Urney St. Columba's and Donaghmore St. Patrick's returned to senior championship football in 2017.

Rock St. Patrick's won the 2016 Tyrone JFC final defeating Tattyreagh 1-9 to 1-6 in Dungannon to earn promotion to the 2017 Tyrone Intermediate Championship.

Championship Draw

First round

Quarter-finals

Semi-finals

Final

Tyrone Intermediate Football Championship
Gaelic football competitions in County Tyrone